Antoine Bailly (4 July 1944 – 26 June 2021) was a French-born Swiss geographer. He worked as a professor of geography in France, Canada, and Switzerland. He held a doctoral degree from Paris-Sorbonne University, as well as degrees from the University of Pennsylvania and the University of Franche-Comté.

Biography
Bailly was the co-author of over 30 books and more than 300 articles in the fields of geography and regional science. He was a co-founder of the École suisse de nouvelle géographie alongside Jean-Bernard Racine and Claval.

Bailly received the Founder's Medal from the Regional Science Association International, the highest distinction in regional science, in 2008. He was given a doctor honoris causa from Alexandru Ioan Cuza University, the University of Lisbon, the Université du Québec, and the Hungarian Academy of Sciences. In 2000, he was made a Knight of the Ordre national du Mérite. In 2021, he was nominated for membership into the Lisbon Academy of Sciences.

Antoine Bailly died on 26 June 2021 at the age of 76.

References

Swiss geographers
1944 births
2021 deaths
Paris-Sorbonne University alumni
University of Pennsylvania alumni
University of Franche-Comté alumni
Members of the Hungarian Academy of Sciences
Recipients of the Vautrin Lud International Geography Prize
Knights of the Ordre national du Mérite
People from Belfort